Terry W. Nardin (born January 19, 1942) is Professor of Political Science and the Director of the Common Curriculum at Yale-NUS College in Singapore. Formerly, he served as the head of the Political Science Department at the National University of Singapore. He specialises in political theory, history of ideas and international political theory.

His most well-known book is Law, Morality, and the Relations of States (1983). He has also contributed to the literature on humanitarian interventions, justice as coercion, the rule of law, Michael Oakeshott and comparative political theory.

References

External links

American political scientists
University of Wisconsin–Milwaukee faculty
Academic staff of the National University of Singapore
New York University alumni
University of Chicago alumni
Living people
1942 births